Champion Township may refer to the following places in the United States:

 Champion Township, Michigan
 Champion Township, Minnesota
 Champion Township, Trumbull County, Ohio

Township name disambiguation pages